Dušan Milošević (1 June 1894 – 19 May 1967) was a Serbian multi sport athlete and Olympian.

He competed as one of two athletes from Serbia at the 1912 Summer Olympics, the other one being Dragutin Tomašević.

In addition to representing the Kingdom of Serbia internationally in track and field and swimming, Milošević was also one of the founders of BSK, as well as one of its first footballers.

References

External links
 
 

1894 births
1967 deaths
Serbian male sprinters
Serbian male swimmers
Serbian footballers
Association football defenders
OFK Beograd players
Olympic athletes of Serbia
Athletes (track and field) at the 1912 Summer Olympics
People from Stragari
Sportspeople from Kragujevac